The Romsey Football Netball Club, nicknamed the Redbacks, is an Australian rules football club located 61 km north of Melbourne in the town of Romsey and affiliated with the Riddell District Football League.

Premierships (25)
Riddell District Football League
1891, 1897, 1898, 1902, 1911, 1920, 1921, 1925, 1926, 1927, 1928, 1929, 1933, 1935, 1936, 1938, 1939, 1948, 1950, 1951, 1963, 1968, 1975, 2003, 2011, 2014, 2015

References

Books
History of Football in the Bendigo District - John Stoward - 

Romsey Football Club
1879 establishments in Australia
Sports clubs established in 1879
Australian rules football clubs established in 1879
Shire of Macedon Ranges